Paid or PAID may refer to:

Paid (1930 film), an American film starring Joan Crawford 
Paid (2006 film), a Dutch film
Personality and Individual Differences, a journal

See also 
 Paide, the capital of Järva County, Estonia
 Pay (disambiguation)